Charles Edward Behan (August 4, 1920May 18, 1945) was a professional American football end for one season for the Detroit Lions.

Football career
Behan caught 4 passes for 63 yards in 1942, his only year with the Lions.

Behan enlisted in the U.S. Armed Forces in 1942 and served in the United States Marine Corps during World War II. Prior to his overseas deployment, he played for the football team at Marine Corps Base Camp Lejeune. In late 1944, when Behan was fighting with the newly reformed Sixth Marine Division on the island of Guadalcanal, he played in a hard-hitting "touch" football game on Christmas Eve between teams representing the 4th and 29th Regiments. Behan was the 29th Marines' player-coach and team captain in what the roster sheets passed out that day labeled "The Football Classic." The game ended in a scoreless tie.

Death at Okinawa
Most Marine players and spectators involved in "The Football Classic" were shipped to Okinawa in April 1945. During the Okinawa campaign, Behan took part in the Battle of Sugar Loaf Hill. During the battle he was hit with shrapnel in the mouth. Insisting to stay on the front lines, Behan applied cotton to his mouth and changed it out regularly. After tossing grenades at a Japanese machine gun nest, Behan was hit by machine-gun fire and died.

Behan was posthumously awarded the Navy Cross.

Notes

External links

Football's wartime heroes

1920 births
1945 deaths
People from Crystal Lake, Illinois
Players of American football from Illinois
American football wide receivers
Northern Illinois Huskies football players
Detroit Lions players
United States Marine Corps officers
United States Marine Corps personnel killed in World War II
Recipients of the Navy Cross (United States)
Deaths by firearm in Japan
Military personnel from Illinois